This is the results breakdown of the local elections held in the Community of Madrid on 10 June 1987. The following tables show detailed results in the autonomous community's most populous municipalities, sorted alphabetically.

Overall

City control
The following table lists party control in the most populous municipalities, including provincial capitals (shown in bold). Gains for a party are displayed with the cell's background shaded in that party's colour.

Municipalities

Alcalá de Henares
Population: 144,268

Alcobendas
Population: 70,227

Alcorcón
Population: 137,884

Coslada
Population: 64,826

Fuenlabrada
Population: 119,848

Getafe
Population: 131,840

Leganés
Population: 167,783

Madrid

Population: 3,058,182

Móstoles
Population: 175,133

Parla
Population: 63,963

Torrejón de Ardoz
Population: 80,066

See also
1987 Madrilenian regional election

References

Madrid
1987